Eokochia is a monotypic genus of flowering plants belonging to the family Amaranthaceae. The only species is Eokochia saxicola.

Its native range is mainland Italy and Sicily.

The genus name is in honour of Wilhelm Daniel Joseph Koch (1771–1849), a German physician and botanist, and the epithet of 'saxicola' is derived from 2 Latin words; saxum meaning rock and incola meaning dwelling in.

It was first described and published in Taxon Vol.60 on page 72 in 2011.

References

Amaranthaceae
Amaranthaceae genera
Plants described in 1855
Flora of Italy 
Flora of Sicily
Monotypic Caryophyllales genera